Martin Rechsteiner (born 15 February 1989) is a Liechtensteiner former international footballer who played as a right back. He last played club football for FC Balzers.

Career
Born in Altstätten, Switzerland, Rechsteiner played club football for FC Schaan, USV Eschen/Mauren and FC Vaduz.

He made his senior international debut for Liechtenstein in 2008, and appeared in FIFA World Cup qualifying matches.

After a three and a half-year retirement from international football, Rechsteiner was called in for the UEFA Euro 2016 qualifying match against Montenegro on 5 September 2015.

Rechsteiner announced his retirement from football at the end of 2019. He is currently a co-trainer of the Liechtenstein U-17s.

References

1989 births
Living people
Liechtenstein footballers
Liechtenstein international footballers
Swiss men's footballers
Swiss people of Liechtenstein descent
People with acquired Liechtenstein citizenship
FC Balzers players
USV Eschen/Mauren players
FC Vaduz players
Association football fullbacks
People from Altstätten
Sportspeople from the canton of St. Gallen